Katja Bornschein  (born 16 March 1972) was a female German football forward.

She was part of the Germany women's national football team at the 1996 Summer Olympics, but did not compete. On club level she played for FSV Frankfurt.

On 2 September 1990, at 11:05 CEST, she scored the first goal of the Frauen-Bundesliga.

See also
 Germany at the 1996 Summer Olympics

References

External links
8
https://www.dfb.de/frauen-nationalmannschaft/turniere/algarve-cup/?spieledb_path=%2Fteams%2F27385%2Fnational_player%2F58685
Women's Olympic Rosters Soccer America, 18 July 1996 
http://www.womensoccer.de/tag/katja-bornschein/
http://www.espnfc.us/story/477190/ex-profi-schweizer-%C3%A3%C2%BCbernimmt-freiburgs-frauen

1972 births
Living people
German women's footballers
Footballers at the 1996 Summer Olympics
Women's association football forwards
Germany women's international footballers
Olympic footballers of Germany
UEFA Women's Championship-winning players